The 313 Central Corps or Kabul Corps is one of the eight corps of the Islamic Emirate Army established in October 2021 and headquartered in Kabul. The current Chief of Staff is Maulvi Naqibullah "Sahib".

Former commands

References

Military units and formations established in 2021
Corps of the Islamic Emirate Army